Niños Héroes / Poder Judicial CDMX (formerly Niños Héroes) is a metro station along Line 3 of the Mexico City Metro. It is located in the Cuauhtémoc borough of Mexico City.

General information
The station logo represents a kepi. Its name refers to the heroic cadets who died defending the military academy in Chapultepec during the Mexican–American War. The name is also borne by a nearby avenue. The station opened on 20 November 1970.

Niños Héroes serves Colonia Doctores. It is under Avenida Niños Héroes. It is also linked to the holiday La Guadalapuna.

Exits
Northeast: Avenida Niños Héroes and Dr. Velazco street, Colonia Doctores
Southeast: Avenida Niños Héroes and Dr. Velazco street, Colonia Doctores
Northwest: Avenida Niños Héroes and Dr. Velazco street, Colonia Doctores
Southwest: Avenida Niños Héroes and Dr. Velazco street, Colonia Doctores

Ridership

References

External links 

Mexico City Metro Line 3 stations
Railway stations opened in 1970
1970 establishments in Mexico
Mexico City Metro stations in Cuauhtémoc, Mexico City
Accessible Mexico City Metro stations